Saraswathy Kandasami is a Malaysian politician who served as Senator in the Pakatan Harapan (PH) administration under Prime Minister Anwar Ibrahim since December 2022. She has served as the Deputy Minister of Entrepreneur Development and Cooperatives since December 2022.

Prior to entering politics, Kandasami was a lawyer.

Election results

References 

Living people
21st-century Malaysian women politicians
People's Justice Party (Malaysia) politicians
Women government ministers of Malaysia
Malaysian lawyers
Year of birth missing (living people)
Women members of the Dewan Negara